The Ross RH-3 is a single seat, mid-wing glider that was designed by Harland Ross.

Design and development
Ross designed the R-3 as simplified version of the Ross R-2 Ibis with the intention of making the aircraft type easier to construct for amateur builders. The fuselage remained similar to the R-2, but the wing was redesigned as a straight wing, in contrast to the R-2's complex gull wing. The R-3 design was intended to be of all-wooden construction and employed a NACA 23018 airfoil section. Ross never constructed an example of the R-3.

Marvin Hicks of Aurora, Colorado purchased a set of plans and built a modified version of the aircraft over a ten-year period, culminating in a first flight on 1 January 1963. Hicks' aircraft used an increased span wing with flaps and a NACA 63 (3)-618 laminar flow airfoil. He designated the aircraft as the RH-3, indicating Ross-Hicks as contributing designers. The RH-3 proved to be a good performer in soaring contests.

Variants
R-3
Original Ross design, with a NACA 23018 airfoil. None built.
RH-3
Hicks modified Ross design, with a NACA 63 (3)-618 laminar flow airfoil. One built.

Specifications (RH-3)

See also

References

1960s United States sailplanes
Harland Ross aircraft
Aircraft first flown in 1963
Mid-wing aircraft